Kim Joo-Jin (born 21 June 1986) is a male judoka from South Korea.

On 9 February 2008, he won the gold medal in the -66 kg at the Super World Cup (Tournoi de Paris), beating 2004 Olympic champion Masato Uchishiba by ippon in the final. Kim also won the bronze medal in the -66 kg at the 2008 Asian Judo Championships in Jeju, South Korea. He competed in the half-lightweight division at the 2008 Summer Olympics.

References

External links
 
 

1986 births
Living people
Judoka at the 2008 Summer Olympics
Olympic judoka of South Korea
Asian Games medalists in judo
Judoka at the 2010 Asian Games
South Korean male judoka
Asian Games gold medalists for South Korea
Medalists at the 2010 Asian Games
21st-century South Korean people